The Shaanxi Baojii Special Vehicles Lie Ying Falcon ("Semi-Open Cabin With Tandem Seats Falcon"), otherwise known as Hunting Eagle Strike Gyrocopter, is a Chinese autogyro that was designed and produced by the Shaanxi Baojii Special Vehicles Manufacturing Company of Baoji in Shaanxi province. The aircraft was supplied complete and ready-to-fly.

The manufacturer is a well-known builder of armoured vehicles for police and military use and the aircraft was reportedly flying in 2015, but the original website was taken down in late 2016. However, there is a new company website.

The aircraft gained media attention when it appears as part of 2019 China National Day military parade. Nicknamed "air tricycle", the aircraft reportedly costs approximately 40,000 Chinese Yuan.

Design and development
The Falcon was designed for police and military use as a surveillance aircraft. It features a single main rotor, a two-seats-in tandem open cockpit with a windshield, tricycle landing gear and a Rotax 914 engine in pusher configuration. The Rotax engine is an Austrian-made, four-cylinder, liquid- and air-cooled, four stroke turbocharged  unit.

The basic model of the aircraft is a two-seater. An upgraded three-seater version of the aircraft also exists. The three-seat variant feature a  engine, a larger fuel tank made from different materials, to give greater range, and allow the transportation of more cargo, as well as for parachuting operations.

Specifications (Falcon)

See also
List of rotorcraft

References

Lie
2010s Chinese civil utility aircraft
2010s Chinese military utility aircraft
Single-engined pusher autogyros